Satoru Nakamura may refer to:

Satoru Nakamura (Scouting) (1893–1972), Japanese educator and Scouting leader
Nakamura Satoru (general) (1854–1925), Imperial Japanese Army general